Bongor Airport  is an airport serving the city of Bongor, in the Mayo-Kebbi Est Region of Chad.

See also
List of airports in Chad

References

External links 
 Airport record for Bongor Airstrip at Landings.com

Airports in Chad
Mayo-Kebbi Est Region